Terri Lyne Carrington (born August 4, 1965) is an American jazz drummer, composer, producer, and educator. She has played with Dizzy Gillespie, Stan Getz, Clark Terry, Herbie Hancock, Wayne Shorter, Joe Sample, Al Jarreau, Yellowjackets, and many others. She toured with each of Hancock's musical configurations (from electric to acoustic) between 1997 and 2007.

In 2007 she was appointed professor at her alma mater, Berklee College of Music, where she received an honorary doctorate in 2003. She has won three Grammy Awards, including a 2013 award for Best Jazz Instrumental Album, which established her as the first female musician to win a Grammy in this category.

Carrington serves as founder and artistic director of the Berklee Institute of Jazz and Gender Justice and The Carr Center in Detroit, Michigan. She also serves on the board of trustees for The Recording Academy, board of directors for International Society for Jazz Arrangers and Composers and the advisory board for The History Makers and New Music USA.

Early years
Carrington was born on August 4, 1965, in Medford, Massachusetts, United States, into a musical family: her mother played piano as a hobby and her father was a saxophonist and president of the Boston Jazz Society. At the age of seven, Carrington was given a set of drums that had belonged to her grandfather, Matt Carrington, who had played with Fats Waller and Chu Berry. After studying privately for three years, she gave her first major performance at the Wichita Jazz Festival with Clark Terry. At the age of 11, she received a full scholarship to Berklee College of Music.

At Berklee College of Music she played with musicians such as Kevin Eubanks, Donald Harrison, and Greg Osby. She also studied under drum instructor Alan Dawson and made a private recording entitled TLC and Friends, with Kenny Barron, Buster Williams, George Coleman and her father.

Music career

In 1983, encouraged by her mentor, Jack DeJohnette, Carrington moved to New York, where she worked with Lester Bowie, Stan Getz, James Moody, David Sanborn, Pharoah Sanders, and Cassandra Wilson. In the late 1980s Carrington moved to Los Angeles, where she was the house drummer for The Arsenio Hall Show and later the drummer on Quincy Jones' late-night TV show VIBE hosted by Sinbad.

As a bandleader, she has worked with Geri Allen, James Genus, Josh Harri, Bob Hurst, Everette Harp, Nona Hendryx, Munyungo Jackson, Ingrid Jensen, Aruan Ortiz, Greg Phillinganes, Tineke Postma, Patrice Rushen, Nêgah Santos, Dwight Sills, Esperanza Spalding, Helen Sung, and Gary Thomas.

In summer 2011, she appeared with Wayne Shorter, John Patitucci, Danilo Perez in South America. She was musical director of the Sing the Truth Tour with Dianne Reeves, Lizz Wright and Angelique Kidjo (with Romero Lubambo, Geri Allen, James Genus, and Munyungo Jackson).

As a recording artist, in 1988 Carrington started concentrating her efforts on writing and producing her own works, resulting in Real Life Story, her 1989 Grammy-nominated debut album with Gerald Albright, Hiram Bullock, Greg Osby, Dianne Reeves, Patrice Rushen, Carlos Santana, John Scofield, Wayne Shorter, and Grover Washington Jr.; Jazz Is a Spirit, her 2002 European album with Terence Blanchard, Kevin Eubanks. Herbie Hancock, Wallace Roney, and Gary Thomas; and Structure, her 2004 European album with Greg Osby, Jimmy Haslip, and Adam Rogers.

In 2009, Carrington released More to Say ... Real Life Story: NextGen, a sequel to Real Life Story. The album includes Walter Beasley, George Duke, Lawrence Fields, Ray Fuller, Everette Harp, Jimmy Haslip, Robert Irving III, Chuck Loeb, Christian McBride, Les McCann, Lori Perry, Greg Phillinganes, Patrice Rushen, Dwight Sills, Chris Walker, Kirk Whalum, Anthony Wilson, Nancy Wilson, and a special appearance by Sonny Carrington.

In 2011 The Mosaic Project, her fifth album and her first for Concord Jazz, was released. It won the 2011 Grammy Award for Best Jazz Vocal Album. Carrington's 2013 album, Money Jungle: Provocative in Blue, included covers of songs by Duke Ellington, Charles Mingus, and Max Roach's 1962 album, Money Jungle, and won the 2013 Grammy Award for Best Jazz Instrumental Album. She is the first female musician to win a Grammy in this category.

Carrington's interdisciplinary work includes collaborations with visual artists Mickalene Thomas, Carrie Mae Weems, and choreographer Winifred R. Harris.

In October 2020, the National Endowment for the Arts (NEA) announced Carrington as one of four recipients of the NEA Jazz Masters Fellowships, celebrated in an online concert and show on 22 April 2021. Awarded in recognition of lifetime achievement, the honor is bestowed on individuals who have made significant contributions to the art form. The other 2021 recipients were Albert "Tootie" Heath, Phil Schaap, and Henry Threadgill.

September 2022 saw the publication of Carrington's book New Standards: 101 Lead Sheets by Women Composers and New Standards Vol. 1, an ambitious new endeavor created to uplift the voices of women composers. The 2022 album of 11 selections from the songbook features an all-star band plus a dozen special guests. Carrington also released a children’s book, Three of a Kind - The Allen Carrington Spalding Trio, a non-fiction illustrated poem about three women who became musical companions through their love of jazz.

Awards and honors

Discography

As leader or co-leader 
 TLC and Friends (CEI, 1981)
 Real Life Story (Verve Forecast, 1989)
 Jazz Is a Spirit (ACT, 2002)
 Structure with Adam Rogers, Jimmy Haslip, Greg Osby (ACT, 2004)
 More to Say (Real Life Story: NextGen.) (E1 Entertainment, 2009)
 The Mosaic Project (Concord Jazz, 2011)
 Money Jungle: Provocative in Blue (Concord Jazz, 2013)
 The Mosaic Project: Love and Soul (Concord/Universal, 2015)
 The Act Years (ACT, 2015) – compilation with selections from Jazz Is a Spirit, Structure, and Nguyên Lê's Purple: Celebrating Jimi Hendrix
 Murray, Allen & Carrington Power Trio, Perfection (Motéma, 2016)
 Terri Lyne Carrington & Social Science, Waiting Game (Motéma, 2019)
 New Standards Vol. 1 (Candid, 2022)

As sidewoman

References

External links
 Official site

1965 births
African-American drummers
African-American music educators
American jazz drummers
Berklee College of Music alumni
American women drummers
American women jazz musicians
Grammy Award winners
Living people
Jazz musicians from Massachusetts
People from Medford, Massachusetts
American jazz educators
Alessa Records artists
20th-century American drummers
Women jazz composers
20th-century American women musicians
Women music educators
Yellowjackets members
Concord Records artists
ACT Music artists
Verve Forecast Records artists
Motéma Music artists
African-American women musicians
20th-century African-American women
20th-century African-American people
20th-century African-American musicians
21st-century African-American people
21st-century African-American women